Miyakawa (written: 宮川) is a Japanese surname. Notable people with the surname include:

, Japanese footballer
, Japanese judge
, Japanese artistic gymnast

Japanese-language surnames